Your Side is Taiwanese Mandopop artist Stanley Huang's debut Mandarin solo studio album. It was released on 1 March 2000 by EMI Music Taiwan.

Track listing
睡 (Shui) – 2:31
妳身邊 (Ni Shen Bian) – Your Side – 4:52
冷水澡 (Leng Shui Zao) – Cold Shower – 3:53
狀元 (Zhuang Yuan) – 3:52
青春真残酷 (Qing Chun Zhen Can Ku) – 4:26
Leave Me Alone – 4:01
妳 (Ni) – You – 4:10
放風聲 (Fang Feng Sheng) – 3:46
愛人未遂 (Ai Ren Wei Sui) – 3:23
相约不如偶遇 (Xiang Yue Bu Ru Ou Yu) – 3:59

References

2000 albums
Stanley Huang albums